This is an all-time list of winners of the four Grand Slam men's and women's singles tennis tournaments, organized by country. The year of the first win in each tournament is shown in parentheses. Each player's first grand slam tournament win is shown in bold. The greatest number of wins in each country (in the total column) is shown in bold.

Grand Slam singles champions by country

Argentina

Australia

Austria

Belarus

Belgium

Brazil

Canada

Chile

China

Croatia

Czechoslovakia

Czech Republic

Denmark

Ecuador

Egypt

France

Germany

Hungary

Italy

Japan

Kazakhstan

Latvia

Mexico

Netherlands

New Zealand

Norway

Poland

Romania

Russia

Serbia

South Africa

Spain

Sweden

Switzerland

United Kingdom

United States

Yugoslavia

Total Grand Slam titles by country 

 : 350
 : 166
 : 98
 : 40
 : 39
 : 38
 : 28
 : 26
 : 23
 : 15
 : 13
 : 11
 : 10
 : 9
 : 7
 : 6
 : 5
 : 5
 : 5
 : 4
 : 4
 : 3
 : 3
 : 3
 : 2
 : 2
 : 2
 : 2
 : 2
 : 1
 : 1
 : 1
 : 1
 : 1
 : 1
 : 1
 : 1

Notes

See also 
 List of Grand Slam champions by country